{{DISPLAYTITLE:C3H5NO4}}
The molecular formula C3H5NO4 (molar mass: 119.08 g/mol, exact mass: 119.0219 u) may refer to:

 Hadacidin
 β-Nitropropionic acid, or 3-nitropropanoic acid